Seabed mining, also known as Seafloor mining is the recovery of minerals from the seabed by techniques of underwater mining. The concept includes mining at shallow depths on the continental shelf and deep-sea mining at greater depths associated with tectonic activity, hydrothermal vents and the abyssal plains. While there is opportunity for economical mineral extraction at areas of high concentration of valuable minerals, there is also significant risk of ecological damage of unknown and to some degree, unpredictable, extent.
Increasing requirements for minerals and metals, largely for use in the technology sector, has led to renewed interest in exploitation of seabed mineral resources. including massive polymetallic sulfide deposits around hydrothermal vents, cobalt-rich crusts on the sides of seamounts and fields of manganese nodules on the abyssal plains.

Seabed mining will affect the distinctive, and sometimes unique, assemblages of marine species associated with those areas of the seafloor to an extent not currently predictable due to lack of data.

Scope
The varied and complex physical, chemical, geological and biological processes occurring in the ocean can sometime produce economically viable concentrations  of a range of minerals, notably in the vicinity of hydrothermal vents, where highly concentrated fluids precipitate out their solutes on cooling. So far (2022) the technical and economic problems of extraction have not been overcome for most deposits, though there have been some viable underwater mining operations, notably the recovery of diamonds off the west coast of southern Africa.

Deposits of diamonds, iron sands with titanomagnetite and lime-soda feldspars, cobalt-rich manganese crusts, phosphorite nodules and manganese nodules are already known. The value and scarcity of rare earth elements is encouraging investigation into the possibility of refining them from seabed deposits.There is alsoscope for extracting methane from gas hydrates in marine sediment on continental slopes and rises.

Large quantities of gas hydrates are potentially available, as 1 m3 methane hydrate can yield 164 m3 of methane gas. However, the process is technologically complex and costly, so commercial exploitation has not yet started. Estimates of the global mass of marine methane hydrates range from about 550 to 1,146 Gt C. Reserves of gas hydrates are widely distributed in the sediment of continental slopes and rises and on land beneath polar permafrost, with an estimated 95% in continental margin deposits.

History
On the Namibian west coast of southern Africa, Diamond Fields International Ltd started shallow seabed mining for diamonds in 2001. The De Beers Group continues to use specialized ships to recover diamonds from the seabed. They extracted 1.4 million carats from the EEZ of Namibia in 2018, and in 2019, De Beers commissioned a new ship which is expected to improve productivity by a factor of two.

Technology

Seabed minerals mining proposals are all based on similar concept of a seabed resource collector, a lifting system and surface vessels which may process the material offshore or transport ores to land based facilities. Most of the proposed collection systems would use remotely operated vehicles, which would remove deposits from the seabed using mechanical devices or pressurized water jets. Robotic excavation machinery has been built to work deposits off Papua New Guinea, intended to start operations in 2019. These include a bulk cutter which is intended to break up the surface rock, a collecting machine which will work like a suction dredger to pump the fragments to the lift pump which will transfer the material to a ship at the surface, to be transported to a site where it will be processed. These are massive machines which maneuver around the seabed on caterpillar tracks. Minerals which concentrate in seafloor massive sulfides can be rich in metals such as copper, gold, silver, and zinc, will be mined, but these deposits need to be broken up for extraction and transport. Natural gas would be extracted from reservoirs of gas hydrate by injecting chemical inhibitors, depressurising the reservoir, or increasing the temperature.

Impact

There is a potential for positive economic impact for both the mining industries involved and the industries that need the available minerals, and for the countries with exclusive economic zones in which the deposits are located.

There is also the potential for severe environmental impact by damage to sensitive and sometimes unique ecosystems by seabed disturbance and deposits of disturbed material on downstream regions. Interest in mining possibilities is providing impetus for scientific study of the deposits and the mechanisms of their formation. Biologists are concerned about the little known communities of exotic life forms which could be destroyed before they are studied. There has not been sufficient research to make predictions with any reasonable level of confidence.

Each vent discharges a unique mix of solutes, so each vent is colonized by a different combination of life forms, and researchers are continually finding new species, but a common feature of the vents is that their ecosystems thrive in conditions that would be highly hostile to most other known life, some of which might be of economic value, and might provide valuable insights into the evolution of terrestrial life. There are also concerns about the safety of the systems planned for mineral recovery, and the possible impact of accidents involving such equipment on the local and wider environment.

Legal aspects

The International Seabed Authority (ISA) was established in 1982 to regulate human activities on the deep-sea floor beyond the continental shelf. It continues to develop rules for commercial mining, and as of 2016, has issued 27 contracts for mineral exploration, covering a total area of more than 1.4 million km2. Other seabed mining operations are already proceeding within exclusive economic zones of nation states, usually at relatively shallow depths on the continental shelf.

The jurisdiction governing human activity in the ocean is zoned by distance from land. Coastal states also have exclusive rights and jurisdiction over the resources within their  exclusive economic zone (EEZ). Some states also have sovereign rights over the seabed and any mineral resources over an extended continental shelf beyond the EEZ. Further offshore is the area beyond national jurisdiction (ABNJ), which covers both the seabed and the water column above it. UNCLOS designates this region as the common heritage of mankind. UNCLOS provides the legal framework, and regulation and control of mineral-related activities are the responsibility of the ISA, comprising the signatory states to UNCLOS. UNCLOS Article 136 covers the common heritage of mankind, Article 137.2 covers resources and Article 145 covers the protection of the marine environment, in areas beyond national jurisdiction

Exclusive economic zone

International waters

In June 2021, the president of Nauru stressed the urgency of finalizing regulations for mining in international waters to the council of the International Seabed Authority (ISA), a body of the United Nations.

ISA has been working on the Mining Code, regulations governing commercial mining of the deep seafloor, since 2014 and was scheduled to publish them in 2020,  The Nauru request triggered a "2-year rule" which compels ISA to finalize the rules by mid-2023.or accept applications for exploitation in the absence of formal guidelines, leaving many questions about the long-term effects of seabed mining unresolved.

References

Underwater work
Mining